Sepidar Rural District is a rural district (dehestan) in the Central District of Boyer-Ahmad County, Kohgiluyeh and Boyer-Ahmad Province, Iran. At the 2006 census, its population was 8,494, in 1,650 families, 5.1 people per family. The rural district has 69 villages.

References 

 Sepidar Map

Rural Districts of Kohgiluyeh and Boyer-Ahmad Province
Boyer-Ahmad County